Llansawel F.C. was a Welsh football club that merged with Briton Ferry Athletic to form Briton Ferry Llansawel A.F.C.

Introduction

Llansawel Football Club's home pitch was based at Neath Sports Centre and is the main centre pitch, situated next to the pitch is a covered 150 capacity stand. The club was formed in 1985.

Honours

 Neath League Division 4 Winners – once
 1993/1994
 Neath League Division 1 Winners – once
 1998/1999
 Neath League Premier Division Winners – 4 times
 2000/2001, 2002/2003, 2004/2005, 2005/2006
 Neath League Premier Division Cup Winners – 4 times
 2000/2001, 2002/2003, 2004/2005, 2005/2006
 Neath League Open Cup Winners – 3 times
 2002/2003, 2003/2004, 2005/2006
 Neath League Rose Bowl Winners – twice
 2004/2005, 2005/2006
 Neath League 75th Anniversary 6-a-side Winners
 2005/2006
 Borough Cup Winners – once
 2005/2006

Football clubs in Wales
Association football clubs established in 1985
Association football clubs disestablished in 2009
1985 establishments in Wales
2009 disestablishments in Wales
Welsh Football League clubs
Neath & District League clubs